Anthony Joseph Graffanino (born Graffagnino, June 6, 1972) is a former American  Major League Baseball second baseman, third baseman, and shortstop.

Career
Graffanino was primarily a contact hitter (just 481 strikeouts in 2787 big-league at-bats) who was able to get on base (career .336 OBP) – and his speed was above average, with 53 stolen bases in 78 attempts. He excelled as a situational hitter, being capable of hitting behind the runner and dropping down a bunt. As a fielder, he had the ability to play every infield position and left field. He had an above-average arm, which helped him in LF and on the left side of the infield.

Obtained by the Boston Red Sox for Chip Ambres and Juan Cedeño after the All-Star Game, he started at second base following the cut of Mark Bellhorn.

In 2005, Graffanino hit .298 for the Royals and .319 with the Red Sox for a combined .309 (117-for-379), a career high. He also posted career numbers in RBI (38), runs (68), doubles (17), games (110), and hits. He made an error in the fifth inning of Game Two of the 2005 American League Division Series which led to three unearned runs. The runs came on a two-out, three-run home run by White Sox 2B Tadahito Iguchi which proved to be the game-winning hit. The Red Sox were swept in that series.

Graffanino was claimed off waivers by the Royals prior to the start of the 2006 season. He hit .268 in 69 games for the Royals before being traded to the Milwaukee Brewers at the  All-Star Break for left-handed pitcher, Jorge De La Rosa.

In , Graffanino struggled to begin the year, but after the call up of talented prospect Ryan Braun, Graffanino seemed to be invigorated and raised his sub .200 batting average to over .240 over a month's time. He slugged nine home runs in only 231 at bats that season. But on August 8, Graffanino tore his ACL, ending his season with a .238 batting average. After the 2007 World Series, he officially became a free agent.

On June 24, 2008, he signed a minor league contract with the Cleveland Indians. He hit .315 in 25 games and became a free agent at the end of the season. In February , he re-signed with the Indians. In October 2009 Graffanino became a free agent.

Personal life
, Graffanino identified as an evangelical Christian. He remained active in the community during his career. In 2002, he coordinated and led baseball clinics for boys and girls from Mercy Home at U.S. Cellular Field and signed autographs at the James R. Thompson Center to promote the need for organ donors.

Graffanino was born Anthony Graffagnino but dropped the second "g" after numerous mispronunciations from minor league announcers. He grew up in East Islip, New York. He and his wife, Nicole, have two sons, A.J. and Nicholas. A.J. was drafted by the Braves in the eighth round of the 2018 Major League Baseball draft.

References

External links

The Tony Graffanino Foundation - The Tony Graffanino Foundation
Resources and links at BrewCrewBall.com

1972 births
Living people
Atlanta Braves players
Baseball players from New York (state)
Boston Red Sox players
Buffalo Bisons (minor league) players
Chicago White Sox players
Cleveland Indians players
Durham Bulls players
Greenville Braves players
Kansas City Royals players
Macon Braves players
Major League Baseball infielders
Milwaukee Brewers players
Omaha Royals players
People from Amityville, New York
People from East Islip, New York
Richmond Braves players
Sportspeople from Suffolk County, New York
Tampa Bay Devil Rays players
American evangelicals